Bob Rich is an American cartoonist. He received the U.S. National Cartoonist Society Newspaper Illustration Award for 2003.

Awards
 Best in Newspaper Illustration winner 2005 and 2003, finalist 2009 – National Cartoonist Society
 First Place – 2011, 2005 and 1996 NEAPNEA award (New England Associated Press Executives Association), for illustration
 Second Place – 2008 and 2007 NEAPNEA award, illustration
 Second Place – 2008 NEAPNEA award, informational graphic
 Third Place – 2003, 1997 and 1995 NEAPNEA award, illustration
 First Place – Editorial Cartooning, 2003, 2002, 2001, 2000, 1999, 1998, 1997, 1996, 1995, 1994 and 1992 Society of Professional Journalists, Connecticut Chapter,
Excellence in Journalism Awards
 Second Place – Editorial Cartooning, 2001, 1998, 1997, 1996, 1993 Society of Professional Journalists, Connecticut Chapter, Excellence in Journalism Awards
 Honorable Mention – 1984/85 John Fischetti Editorial Cartoonist Competition
 First Place – Editorial Cartooning, 1984 UPI New England Newspaper Awards
 1989 Ira V. Hiscock Award, given by the Connecticut Public Health Association for contributing notably to the field of health
 Honorable Mention – 1983 Charles M. Schulz Award for Promising Cartoonists

References

External links
 NCS Awards

American cartoonists
Living people
Year of birth missing (living people)